Clarkefield railway station is located on the Deniliquin line in Victoria, Australia. It serves the town of Clarkefield, and it opened in December 1862 as Lancefield Road. It was renamed Lancefield Junction in 1881, renamed Clarkfield on 11 January 1926, and renamed Clarkefield on 23 February 1926.

History

Clarkefield opened in December 1862, a year after the line opened between Sunbury and Woodend. The station, like the township itself, was named after local pastoralist, businessman and philanthropist, Sir William Clarke. Clarke later became a member of the Victorian Legislative Council.

The station was the junction for the Lancefield branch line, which operated between 1881 and 1956. The station was historically known as Lancefield Junction for this reason.

Catch points were in use at Clarkefield in 1929. By 1935, they were abolished. In 1947, the signal box at the station was replaced with a signal bay.

After the closure of the Lancefield line in 1956, a small remnant of the line became a refuge siding. Around 1958/1959, a siding that operated between the Up mainline track and the former dock platform was abolished, and the siding leading to the turntable was removed by 1959.

In 1977, the connections from the refuge siding to the Up line was spiked out of use, with the auxiliary frame also abolished around this time.

On 17 January 2005, the signal bay at the station was abolished.

Disused station Rupertswood is located between Clarkefield and Sunbury stations.

Platforms and services

Clarkefield has two side platforms. In the morning, trains to Melbourne depart from Platform 2, and trains to Bendigo depart from Platform 1, with this arrangement reversing in the afternoon. This is to allow services in the peak direction of travel to use the single 160 km/h track that was upgraded in 2006, as part of the Regional Fast Rail project.

It is serviced by V/Line Bendigo and Echuca line services.

Platform 1:
 services to Southern Cross, Kyneton, Bendigo, Eaglehawk and Epsom
 services to Echuca and Southern Cross

Platform 2:
 services to Kyneton, Bendigo, Eaglehawk, Epsom and Southern Cross
 services to Echuca and Southern Cross

Transport links

Dysons operates one route via Clarkefield station, under contract to Public Transport Victoria:
Lancefield – Sunbury station

Gallery

References

External links

Victorian Railway Stations gallery
Melway map at street-directory.com.au

Railway stations in Australia opened in 1862
Regional railway stations in Victoria (Australia)
Shire of Macedon Ranges